Friday Morning Quarterback (better known as FMQB) was a trade magazine which covered the radio and music industries in the United States. Its coverage included programming, management, promotion, marketing, and airplay for music formatted radio. The magazine was founded in 1968 by Kal Rudman and was read by thousands of industry professionals.  The website also hosted an industry database of over 5,000 music and radio professionals. In 2020, FMQB was sold to music industry veteran Fred Deane and re-branded Deane Media Solutions (DMS).

References

Music magazines published in the United States
Cherry Hill, New Jersey
Monthly magazines published in the United States
Magazines established in 1968
Professional and trade magazines
Magazines published in New Jersey